The counts of Segni (also known as Conti or De Comitibus for short) were an important noble family of medieval and early modern Italy originating in Segni, Lazio.
Many members of the family acted as military commanders or ecclesiastical dignitaries, including many cardinals and four popes.

The family is on historical record beginning with Trasimondo, the father of Lotario Conti, who became Pope Innocent III in 1198.
The second Conti pope was Ugolino (1227-1241), as Gregory IX, the third Rinaldo, as Alexander IV (r. 1254-1261). Bishop Paul of Tripoli (1261–1285) was a Conti and his sister Lucienne was the princess of Antioch. Medieval to Renaissance era cardinals of the family include Giovanni dei Conti di Segni, Niccolò dei Conti di Segni, Ottaviano di Paoli,  Giovanni Conti (d. 1493) and Francesco Conti (d. 1521).
In medieval Rome, both the Torre dei Conti (built in 1238) and the Torre delle Milizie, testified to the feudal power of the family.

In the early modern period, Michelangelo Conti reigned as Pope Innocent XIII from 1721 to 1724.
Torquato Conti (1591–1636) served as a general-field marshal of the Holy Roman Empire during the Thirty Years' War, where his cruelty earned him the nickname The Devil.

The family became divided into numerous branches, the principal of which were the counts of Segni and Valmontone, and the dukes of   Poli and Guadagnolo (cf. House of Torlonia). 
The former branch was extinct with Donna Fulvia (died 1611), who had married the count Sforza of Santa Fiora.

See also
House of Visconti
Visconti (disambiguation)

References 

 Dizionario Biografico degli Italiani, Ed. Treccani, v. alle singole voci della famiglia.
 Gaetano Moroni, Dizionario di erudizione storico-ecclesiastica da S. Pietro sino ai nostri giorni, Tipografia Emiliana, Venezia, 1840–1861.

External links

The Cardinals of the Holy Roman Church

Italian noble families
Papal families